The Pistola Mitragliatrice Villar Perosa M1915, official named FIAT Mod. 1915, was an Italian portable automatic weapon developed during World War I by the Officine di Villar Perosa.

Originally designed to be used by the second crew member/observer of military airplanes, it was later issued to ground troops. Between May and November 1916 a section was assigned to each infantry battalion of the Italian army and from May 1917 the number of sections was increased to 3 per battalion.

As it was designed to use 9x19mm ammunition, it is sometimes said to be the first submachine gun, although not a true submachine gun by modern standards. Due to its extremely high rate of fire, it was nicknamed Pernacchia (raspberry) by its operators.

Design
The Villar Perosa was designed as a portable double-barrel machine gun firing a handgun round. It consisted of two independent coupled weapons, each with its own barrel, firing mechanism, and separate 25-round magazine.

Operational history 

As it was originally designed to be operated from airplanes, it had a high rate of fire of over 1,500 rounds per minute. However, in practice the 9mm Glisenti ammunition was not sufficiently powerful to shoot down aircraft, which had become ever more resistant over the course of the war, and in addition the range was inadequate, so it was eventually dismissed by the Corpo Aeronautico.

It was also used during World War I by Italian infantry, with a bipod and a gun shield (which proved to be uncomfortable in combat and was subsequently removed). Despite its high rate of fire, its atypical design, and its weight, it proved to be very effective at short range. It was operated by Bersaglieri too, often mounted on bicycles.

It was in particularly appreciated as a squad weapon by the Arditi, the Royal Italian Army World War I era shock troops, due to its high rate of fire and its weight (it was very light for a support weapon), and went under various modifications: Lt. Col. Giuseppe Bassi personally designed a carrying system (consisting of a leather belt fixed to the handles that was later arranged behind the gunner's neck) and a 1.6 kg bipod and removed the gun shield (which weighed roughly 26 kg) to enhance Arditi performances in battle. In his idea, a section of 8 (later 16) VP machine guns had to support the attack of 20 to 30 Arditi armed with rifles, daggers and hand-grenades, giving adequate suppressive fire and striking the enemy on a psychological level as well. Each weapon was manned by 4 people: a shooter with a backpack or a shoulder ammo bag and 3 ammo carriers, who could take with them up to 5000 rounds.

Some VP machine pistols were equipped with a wooden stock, though the firing mechanism remained unaltered and was not modified in the fashion of, for example, the OVP SMG or the MAB 18.

Legacy
In 1917, Austria-Hungary created a copy of the VP, the Sturmpistole M.18, which featured a straight magazine rather than curved magazines.

The mechanism of the VP was a sound design, and shortly after the end of the war was used as the basis of more practical weapons, such as the OVP submachine gun and the Beretta MAB-18.

Users
 
 : Captured examples
 : Captured examples
 : Trial purposes, chambered in .455 Webley Auto

See also
 Beretta M1918
 Gast gun

References

Bibliography
 George M. Chinn, The Machine Gun. History, Evolution, and Development of Manual, Automatic, and Airborne Repeating Weapons, Volume I.
 Philip Schreier, The World's First Sub-Gun.  Guns & Ammo Surplus Firearms, September 2009.

External links
 YouTube video of the Villar Perosa SMG Firing
 Defence Configuration
 Replica Aircraft Configuration
  Villar Perosa 9mm MOD.15 SMG
 Modern Firearms
 M1915 Video
 YouTube animation showing mechanism of Villar Perosa mounted in Voisin 3 aircraft

9mm Glisenti submachine guns 
Multi-barrel machine guns
Multiple-barrel firearms
Submachine guns of Italy
World War I submachine guns
World War I aircraft guns